Lake Liscia is an artificial lake, in northern Sardinia, Italy, located between the municipalities of Sant'Antonio di Gallura, Luras, Arzachena and Luogosanto, in the Gallura region.

With a capacity of 105 million cubic metres of water, it is the principal reservoir in north eastern Sardinia.

The dam, constructed in 1964, is 65 metres wide.

Liscia